The Textile Institute of Pakistan (TIP) is a private institute in Karachi, Sindh, Pakistan. The Institute was established by the All Pakistan Textile Mills Association (APTMA) in 1994 to create textile professionals to support Pakistan's textile industry. Textile Institute of Pakistan is one of the best art and design institutes in the country.

TIP offers four-year, eight-semester Bachelor's Degree programs in the following disciplines:

 BS Textile Science (TS)
 BS Textile Design Technology (TDT)
 BS Industrial Management and Manufacturing (IMM)
 BBA Textile Management and Marketing (TMM)
 BBA Apparel Manufacturing and Merchandising (AMM)
 BBA Fashion Design Management (FDM)

As of January 2015, TIP is being headed by Mr. Humayun Zafar.

In the past, TIP has been led by Dr. Zubair Bandukda and before him, Mr. Tariq Ikram, former CE Trade & Development Authority of Pakistan (TDAP), former Chairman Export Promotion Bureau (EPB) and former Minister of State, and writer and intellectual Mr. Irfan Husain.

TIP's founding chancellor was Dr. Eqbal Ahmad. Since Dr. Ahmad's demise, architect and thinker Mr. Arif Hasan has served this position. The present Chancellor of Textile Institute of Pakistan is Mr. Abdul Majeed who is a member of National Textile Foundation.

See also
 All Pakistan Textile Mills Association

External links
 TIP official website
 Official facebook page

Universities and colleges in Karachi
Textile schools